The Story Thus Far is the fourth and final album (third studio album) by the band Axium, with David Cook (lead vocals/guitar/egg shaker), Bobby Kerr (drums/tambourine/vocals), Jeff Shrout (guitar/piano), Neal Tiemann (Midwest Kings) (bass guitar), and additional guitar on "AC" by Nick Gibson. Art direction and design was by Bobby Kerr and David Cook and photography by Bad Ass Jackson. The album was produced by Paul Johnson and AXIUM. It was mixed by Paul Johnson and mastered by Ed Knoll.

Cook's win on the seventh season of American Idol brought attention to Axium's past discography.

Track listing

External links

Axium albums
2004 albums